A listing priority number is a United States Fish and Wildlife Service (FWS) way of designating the relative priority of candidate species that the FWS believes should be listed as threatened or endangered under the Endangered Species Act, but due to funding concerns, cannot be listed immediately.

Every candidate species is assigned a priority number from 1 to 12 based on factors such as the magnitude of threats facing the species, the immediacy of the threat and the species' taxonomic status. A lower priority number means that the species is under greater threat. For example, a number of 2 indicates a higher degree of concern than a number of 8.

The following table shows how the FWS determines listing priority numbers.

source: 

United States Fish and Wildlife Service
Nature conservation in the United States